The 2023 Atlético Ottawa season will be the fourth season in the history of Atlético Ottawa. In addition to the Canadian Premier League, the club will compete in the Canadian Championship. This is to be the club's second season under head coach Carlos González.

In the previous season, the club finished 1st in the Canadian Premier League regular season, before losing to Forge FC in the post-season Final.

Current squad 
As of March 8, 2023

Transfers

In

Transferred in

Loans in

Draft picks 
Atlético Ottawa made the 8th and 15th selections in the 2023 CPL–U Sports Draft. Draft picks are not automatically signed to the team roster. Only those who are signed to a contract will be listed as transfers in.

Out

Transferred out

Pre-season friendlies

Competitions

Canadian Premier League

Table

Results summary

Results by Match

Matches

Playoff matches

Canadian Championship

Statistics

Squad and statistics 

|-

|}

Top scorers

Clean sheets

Disciplinary record

Notes

References

Atlético Ottawa seasons
Atleti
Atleti